Belfast Falls may refer to:

 Falls Road, Belfast in Belfast, Northern Ireland
 Belfast Falls (Northern Ireland Parliament constituency)
 Belfast Falls (UK Parliament constituency)
 Lower Falls (District Electoral Area)
 Upper Falls (District Electoral Area)

See also
Belfast (disambiguation)
Falls (disambiguation)